Mr. Shamim was a 2014 popular Pakistani sitcom drama series that airs on Hum TV on Sunday evenings. It stars Ahmad Ali Butt, Sherry Shah and Arisha Razi in lead roles.

Plot 
Each episode features a different scenario and some episodes are about the small family of Mr. Shamim themselves whereas others include guest appearances of other characters.

Cast
Ahmad Ali Butt as Mr. James Shamim
Sherry Shah as Shagufta  
Bashar as Muzammil
Arisha Razi as Zainab
Saboor Ali as Rosie
Mani as Asghar

Guest appearances 
Zuhab Khan as Zaim 
Mariyam Khalif as Tooba 
 Pari Hashmi as Doctor 
Saman Ansari as Muzzamil's Teacher
Ayesha Omar as Sidra Niazi 
Sanam Saeed as Maya
Hira Mani as herself 
Benita David as Ayesha

References

External links
 Official Hum Tv Website

Hum TV original programming
Urdu-language television shows
Pakistani drama television series
2014 Pakistani television series debuts
Pakistani television sitcoms